Christopher Melling (born 27 January 1979) is an English professional pool and snooker player and former world number 1 at World Rules British Eight-Ball.
He won the WEPF World Eightball Championship twice, in 2001 and 2003. He was ranked #1 in 2003 by the World Eightball Pool Federation. Melling has also twice won the International Pool Masters (2001 and 2002) and the European Professional title (2002). He was the first player to win two International Tour events back to back. His entrance by walk-on music is from the song “Wannabe” by Spice Girls. Melling is also the only cue sports player to hold professional status in English 8 ball, American pool and snooker.

Career
In 2001, Melling reached the last 16 of the 2001 WPA World Nine-ball Championship in Cardiff, beating Steve Davis along the way.

Melling tours worldwide to pursue his 9-ball pool career. In October 2010 he won his first European 9-Ball event - the Portugal Open. On 12 June 2011 Melling was crowned China Open champion and received $40,000. This was his first major 9-Ball Pool tournament victory.

In December 2011, Melling participated in the 18th annual Mosconi Cup, and won four of his six matches. A year later he won the Most Valuable Player Award in the 2012 Mosconi Cup.

In January 2013, he reached the final of the Chinese 8-Ball Masters, losing to Gareth Potts. He also lost to Potts in the final of the 2005 World Rules 8-Ball Championship. Also in 2013 he reached the quarter finals of the 2013 WPA World Nine-ball Championship, the World Masters, World Cup of Pool and finished 5th in the US Open 9-Ball Championship.

In May 2014, Melling entered snooker Q School in an attempt to regain his professional status and defeated the likes of former professionals Daniel Wells and Chen Zhe 4–3 and 4–1 respectively, before winning his quarter-final match against Duane Jones 4–3 to earn a two-year tour card for the 2014–15 and 2015–16 seasons. This saw him become the first person to have been a professional in 8-Ball Pool, 9-Ball Pool and Snooker at the same time.

His first match as a professional saw him beat 2003 UK Championship winner Matthew Stevens 5–4 to qualify for the 2014 Wuxi Classic, but he lost 5–1 to Zhao Xintong in the first round. Melling also played in the first round of the International Championship by defeating Luca Brecel 6–5 and was knocked out 6–1 by Zhou Yuelong. His first victory at the venue stage of a ranking event came at the Welsh Open after he edged out Nigel Bond 4–3, before being whitewashed 4–0 by home favourite Michael White in the second round.

The 2015–16 season proved harder for Melling as he could only win four matches all year. He dropped off the tour at the end of the season and could not win enough matches at Q School to win his place back.

Pool titles
 2019 IPT Ultimate Pool Series - Event 2
 2018 Derby City Classic 9-Ball
 2018 World Pool Series 8-Ball Classic
 2017 Derby City Classic 14.1 Challenge
 2012 Mosconi Cup (MVP)
 2012 Mosconi Cup 
 2011 Mosconi Cup 
 2011 China Open 9-Ball Championship 
 2010 Euro Tour Portugal Open
 2005 Snooker PIOS - Event 5
 2003 WEPF World Eightball Championship
 2002 Q School Snooker Challenge Tour - Event 1
 2001 WEPF World Eightball Championship

References

External links

English pool players
Living people
1979 births
World champions in pool
English snooker players
Sportspeople from London